Carbon dioxide snow may refer to:

Dry ice, a solid form of carbon dioxide
Carbon dioxide cleaning, an industrial cleaning method